The year 1809 in architecture involved some significant architectural events and new buildings.

Events
September – Demolition of most of the Anglo-Saxon St Mary's Church, Reculver, on the coast of south-east England, begins.

Buildings and structures

Gordon House, Chelsea, London, England, designed by Thomas Leverton for Colonel James Willoughby Gordon.
Nelson's Column, Montreal, Canada, designed and built by Coade & Sealy of London.
Nelson's Pillar, Dublin, Ireland, design by William Wilkins amended by Francis Johnston, opened.
Armagh Courthouse, Ireland, designed by William Wilkins, completed.
Portsmouth Academy building, Portsmouth, New Hampshire, United States, designed by James Nutter.
Second Theatre Royal, Covent Garden, London, designed by Robert Smirke, opened.
Dunkeld Bridge, Scotland, designed by Thomas Telford, completed.

Awards
 Grand Prix de Rome, architecture: André Chatillon.

Births
February 15 – Owen Jones, Welsh architect and designer (died 1874)
March 29 – Georges-Eugène Haussmann, French town planner (died 1891)
October 31 – Edmund Sharpe, English architect and architectural historian (died 1877)
November 26 – Thomas Talbot Bury, English architect and lithographer (died 1877)

Deaths
November 4 – Gabriel Manigault, American architect (born 1758)

References

Architecture
Years in architecture
19th-century architecture